Gianfranco Rosi (born 30 November 1963) is an Italian-American documentary filmmaker. His 2013 film Sacro GRA won the Golden Lion at the 70th Venice Film Festival, while his 2016 film Fire at Sea won the Golden Bear at the 66th Berlin Film Festival. Rosi is the only documentary filmmaker to win two highest awards at the three major European film festivals (Venice, Berlin, and Cannes) and is the only director besides Michael Haneke, Ang Lee, Ken Loach, and Jafar Panahi to do so in the 21st century.

He was also nominated for an Academy Award for Best Documentary Feature for Fire at Sea.

Early life
Gianfranco Rosi was born in 1963 in Asmara, then Ethiopian–occupied Eritrea. His Italian father worked there as foreign section manager for a bank owned by the IRI. Because of the threat posed by the ongoing Eritrean War of Independence, his parents brought him back in Italy when he was 11. He grew up in Italy and Turkey. At age 19, Rosi dropped out from University of Pisa, where he was studying medicine, to attend the New York University Film School. He stayed in the United States, eventually gaining dual citizenship.

Career 
After graduation, Rosi found his first feature project after being told that Miami, where he shot his student film, reminded of Benares, the holy city in India where Hindus go to die. He spent five years there documenting life around the banks of the Ganges, resulting in Boatman (1993), which was presented at various international film festivals, including Sundance, Locarno, Toronto, and the International Documentary Film Festival Amsterdam.

His next feature film Below Sea Level was shot over the course of four years among the residents of the unincorporated community of Slab City, California. It won the Best Documentary Award of the Orizzonti section at the 2008 Venice Film Festival.

Having befriended author Charles Bowden during the production of Below Sea Level, Rosi was offered to make a film from his 2009 Harper's Magazine article The Sicario and directed El Sicario, Room 164, a face-to-face conversation with a Juárez Cartel sicario claiming over 200 killings. It premiered in competition in the Orizzonti section at the 2010 Venice Film Festival.

Rosi then came back to Italy to work on Sacro GRA (2013), for which he lived for almost three years in a trailer near the Grande Raccordo Anulare, a circular ring road motorway encompassing the center of Rome, documenting the stories of people around it. The film was the first documentary film to be entered in the main competition at the Venice International Film Festival and ended up winning the Golden Lion, its highest award, becoming both the first documentary in Venice's history and the first Italian film in 15 years to receive the award.

Next, Istituto Luce approached him to make a short film about the 2013 migrant shipwreck off the Italian island of Lampedusa, but Rosi soon scrapped the project for a full-length documentary on Italy's treatment of the ongoing European migrant crisis. He shot Fire at Sea (2016) for almost a year in Lampedusa, focusing on the crisis as seen through the people of the island, such as 12-years old Samuele and migrants' doctor Pietro Bartolo. It was entered in competition at the 66th Berlin International Film Festival, winning once again the festival's highest award, the Golden Bear, and receiving widespread international critical acclaim upon its release. The film was the first documentary submitted by Italy for the Academy Award for Best Foreign Film category, although it didn't make the final shortlist, and was nominated for Best Documentary Feature at the 89th Academy Awards. It also won the European Film Award for Best Documentary.

His next film Notturno (2020) was shot over the course of three years among those living in war zones between Syria, Iraq, Kurdistan, and Lebanon. It premiered in competition at the 77th Venice International Film Festival.

Personal life 
Rosi has a daughter, Emma (born ), from a previous marriage ended in the late 2000s.

Filmography

Feature films

Awards and nominations

References

External links

1963 births
Living people
People from Asmara
Italian documentary film directors
Italian cinematographers
Italian film producers
Italian audio engineers
Tisch School of the Arts alumni
University of Pisa alumni
Italian documentary filmmakers
Directors of Golden Bear winners
Directors of Golden Lion winners
Eritrean people of Italian descent
Eritrean emigrants to Italy
European Film Awards winners (people)
Italian emigrants to the United States
People with acquired American citizenship